Pacifica State Beach is the southernmost of Pacifica, California's large beaches. It is a  crescent-shaped beach located at the mouth of the San Pedro Valley in downtown Pacifica off State Route 1, in San Mateo County.

Pacifica State Beach is one of the most popular beginner surfing spots in the San Francisco area. Among surfers it is commonly known as Linda Mar Beach because it fronts Pacifica's Linda Mar subdivision.  It is a State Beach managed by the City of Pacifica through an operating agreement with California State Parks.  The Taco Bell restaurant on the beach side of the highway is reputed to be the world's most scenic Taco Bell location.

Pacifica State Beach provides habitat for the western snowy plover, a shorebird which is designated as threatened under the Endangered Species Act.

Between 1989 and 2005, Pacifica State Beach was the focus of an extensive beach habitat restoration program, in association with the San Pedro Creek flood control and habitat restoration. In 2002, as part of a partnership with the Pacifica Land Trust and the California Coastal Conservancy, this involved the $2.2 million purchase and removal of two oceanside homes and surrounding acreage for the purpose of beach and estuary restoration. This project was identified as a Top Restored Beach by the
American Shore and Beach Preservation Association in 2005, cited as "...an example of a well-planned, well-executed coastal project that is the product of cooperative efforts of the local community, state and federal agencies, scientists, engineers and citizens. The complex beach and habitat restoration project involved over 10 regulatory and permitting agencies, funding from eight granting agencies and the active participation of eight environmental groups. It is one of the first beaches to utilize managed retreat as a method of shoreline protection. In addition to beach nourishment, it has restored habitat for four threatened and endangered species and enhanced community access with expanded parking lots, trails and new restrooms. Over 1 million people visit this beach annually".

Gallery

References

External links

California State Parks webpage
1990 General Plan
California Coastal Records Project
Pacifica State Beach Surf Reports
San Pedro Creek Watershed Coalition
Pacifica Shorebird Alliance
City of Pacifica  - Linda Mar Beach (Pacifica State Beach)

California State Beaches
Pacifica, California
Parks in San Mateo County, California
San Francisco Bay Area beaches
Beaches of San Mateo County, California
Beaches of Northern California